Jutta of Thuringia (1184 – 6 August 1235) was the eldest daughter of Landgrave Hermann I of Thuringia and his first wife, Sophia of Sommerschenburg, a daughter of Fredrick II of Sommerschenburg.

Before 1197, she married Margrave Dietrich I of Meissen.

After her husband's death in 1221, she had a dispute with her brother, Landgrave Louis IV of Thuringia, who was very eager to act as regent and guardian for her three-year-old son Landgrave Henry III.

In 1223, she married her second husband, Count Poppo VII of Henneberg.

Jutta of Thuringia died on 6 August 1235 in Schleusingen.

Marriages and issue 
Children from her marriage to Dietrich I of Meissen:
 Hedwig (d. 1249) married Count Dietrich V of Cleves (1185–1260)
 Otto (died before 1215)
 Sophia (d. 1280) married Count Henry of Henneberg-Schleusingen (d. 1262)
 Jutta
 Henry the Illustrious (1218–1288) Margrave of Meissen

Children from her marriage with Poppo VII of Henneberg:
 Herman I of Henneberg (1224–1290)

External links 
 Entry at genealogie-mittelalter.de

German countesses
1184 births
1235 deaths
13th-century German nobility
Margravines of Meissen
Ludovingians
13th-century German women
Daughters of monarchs
Remarried royal consorts